Madson Formagini Caridade, or simply Madson  (born May 21, 1986 in Volta Redonda), is a Brazilian footballer who plays as an attacking midfielder. He is known for his small stature and his set pieces.

Career
Natural Volta Redonda, Rio de Janeiro, Madson began his career in football still in the youth ranks of local club. In 2005, the team drew the attention of Estádio São Januário, having been hired that year to join the junior division Cruzmaltina, under the command of experienced coach Toninho Barroso. In Estádio São Januário, he played, lived and studied.

At the time, an attacking midfielder extremely skilled and fast, just promoted to professionals in 2006 by then-coach Renato Gaúcho. Despite having become a real sweetheart of Vasco da Gama, failed to provide them a regularity that they hold. Ended up losing even more space on the team with the departure of Renato Gaúcho and the arrival of Celso Roth to the command of Vasco da Gama in 2007.

In January 2009, his contract with Vasco expired and he signed a contract with Santos.

After a good year in the club, Madson was involved in a scandal alongside Zé Eduardo and Felipe, and after this he was loaned to Atlético Paranaense.

However, later in the year, his contract with Atlético was terminated, and he returned to Santos because he "violated the rules of Football Training Department and internal rules of the club".

After his loan in Atlético, Madson returned to Santos. However, he was not in the club's plans, and was loaned to Qatari club Al-Khor, in a five-month deal.

On 26 December 2018, Madson returned to Brazil and joined Fortaleza, newly promoted to the Série A.

References

External links

 zerozero.pt
 crvascodagama
 globoesporte.globo

1986 births
Living people
Brazilian footballers
Brazilian expatriate footballers
Campeonato Brasileiro Série A players
Santos FC players
CR Vasco da Gama players
Duque de Caxias Futebol Clube players
América Futebol Clube (RN) players
Club Athletico Paranaense players
Al-Khor SC players
Fortaleza Esporte Clube players
Centro Sportivo Alagoano players
Associação Desportiva São Caetano players
Expatriate footballers in Qatar
Brazilian expatriate sportspeople in Qatar
Qatar Stars League players
Association football midfielders
People from Volta Redonda
Sportspeople from Rio de Janeiro (state)